Lithospermum incisum is a species of flowering plant in the borage family known by several common names, including fringed puccoon, narrowleaf stoneseed, fringed gromwell, narrowleaf puccoon, and plains stoneseed. It is native to much of central Canada and the United States, where it is known from many types of habitat, but particularly piñon-juniper woodland. It is a hairy perennial herb growing from a taproot and woody caudex. It produces a cluster of stems up to about 30 centimeters long. The stems are lined with narrow, pointed leaves up to 6 centimeters long. The slender, trumpet-shaped flowers are pale to bright yellow or gold, and may approach 4 centimeters long. The corolla face is 1 to 2 centimeters wide, its lobes sometimes ruffled. The smaller cleistogamous (closed) flowers are the main producers of seed.

Traditional uses
Used medicinally by Native Americans, the ground leaves roots and stems were rubbed on the limbs to reduce paralysis. Among the Zuni people, a salve of the powdered root applied ceremonially to swelling of any body part. A poultice of root is used and decoction of the plant is taken for swelling and sore throat. The powdered root mixed with bum branch resin and used for abrasions and skin infections. An infusion of the root is taken for stomachache and kidney problems. The leaves are bound to arrow shafts, close to the point, obscured by sinew wrapping and used in wartime.

References

External links
Jepson Manual Treatment
Southwest Colorado Wildflowers
Photo gallery

incisum
Plants used in traditional Native American medicine
Flora of North America